Roller sports competitions at the 2018 Asian Games were held at the JSC Rollerskate Stadium and the JSC Skateboard Stadium in Jakabaring Sport City, Palembang, Indonesia from 28 to 31 August 2018.

Schedule

Medalists

Skateboarding

Speed skating

Medal table

Participating nations
A total of 70 athletes from 13 nations competed in roller sports at the 2018 Asian Games:

References

External links
Roller skate at the 2018 Asian Games
Skateboarding at the 2018 Asian Games
Official Result Book – Roller Skate
Official Result Book – Skateboard

 
2018
Asian Games
2018 Asian Games events